This is a list of Happy Tree Friends DVD releases. As of 2020, eleven titles have been released.

Internet short compilations

Overkill box set
The first three volumes were releases as a boxed set on October 4, 2005, which includes a Third Strike disc with the regular features plus five bonus episodes:
"Remains to Be Seen" 
"Blind Date"
"Suck It Up!"
"From A to Zoo"
"Mole in the City"

Winter Break
Released on October 4, 2005, the Winter Break DVD features the winter themed episodes:
Tongue Twister Trouble
Snow What? That's What!
Class Act
Out On a Limb
Stealing the Spotlight
Ski Ya, Wouldn't Wanna Be Ya!
Ski Patrol

Kringles
Reindeer Kringle
Tree Kringle
Feast Kringle
Karoling Kringle
Ski Kringle
Train Kringle

Happy Tree Vee
Yulelog
Pretty Colors
Snow Daze

Television series

Complete Disaster
Released on November 5, 2013, this DVD includes all episodes from 1999 to 2012.

See also
 Happy Tree Friends
 List of Happy Tree Friends episodes

References

Home video releases
Happy Tree Friends